The People of India is a title that has been used for at least three books, all of which focussed primarily on ethnography.

The People of India (1868–1875)

John Forbes Watson and John William Kaye compiled an eight-volume study entitled The People of India between 1868 and 1875. The books contained 468 annotated photographs of the native castes and tribes of India.

The origins of the project lay in the desire of Lord Canning to possess photographs of native Indian people. Photography was then a fairly new process and Canning, who was Governor-General of India, conceived of the collection of images for the private edification of himself and his wife. However, the Indian Rebellion of 1857 caused a shift in mindset of the London-based British government, which saw that events had come close to overturning British influence in the country and countered this by placing India under more direct control than had been the case when it relied on the capabilities of the British East India Company to perform such functions. This was the beginning of the British Raj period.

G. G. Raheja has remarked that "the colonial imagination had seized upon caste identities as a means of understanding and controlling the Indian population after the blow to administrative complacency occasioned in 1857." Initial attempts at ethnographic study by the British in India had concentrated on the issues of female infanticide and sati (widow immolation), which were thought to be prevalent in the northern and western areas of the country – especially among the Rajputs – and which the colonial rulers wished to eradicate by a process of social engineering. Following the rebellion, officers then serving in the Indian Civil Service, such as Richard Carnac Temple, were of the opinion that if future unrest was to be avoided then it was necessary to obtain a better understanding of the colonial subjects and in particular those from the rural areas. Early efforts in the sphere of British ethnography in India were concentrated on obtaining an understanding of Indian folk-lore, but another early consequence was that The People of India became an official British government publication.

The photographs compiled by Watson and Kaye were not the first to be taken of Indian people but the project was organised within the framework of attempts by officials to document the people in a methodical, statistically and ethnographically oriented manner, later expressed by Denzil Ibbetson in his 1883 report on the 1881 census of the Punjab, 

The collection was an attempt at a visual documentation of "typical" physical attributes, dress and other aspects of native life that would complement written studies, although it did itself contain brief notes regarding what were thought to be the "essential characteristics" of each community. Thomas Metcalf has said that, "Accurate information about India's peoples now mattered as never before ... [although imperfect] for the most part the work marked out a stage in the transformation of ethnological curiosity ..." Educated Indians were unimpressed with the outcome and with the general undertone that their people had been depicted both unfairly and dispassionately.

Sadhana Naithani has noted that almost all of the British in India at that time

The People of India (1908)

As time passed after the 1857 rebellion, British ethnographic studies and their resultant categorisations were embodied in numerous official publications and became an essential part of the British administrative mechanism, and of those categorisations it was caste that was regarded to be, in the words of Herbert Hope Risley, "the cement that holds together the myriad units of Indian society". Risley, who was an English administrator in the Indian Civil Service, also saw India as an ethnological laboratory, where the continued practice of endogamy had ensured that, in his opinion, there were strict delineations of the various communities by caste and that consequently caste could be viewed as identical to race. Whereas others saw caste as being based on occupation, he believed that changes in occupation within a community led to another instance of endogamy "being held by a sort of unconscious fiction to be equivalent to the difference of race, which is the true basis of the system."

In 1908 Risley published his book, The People of India. By this stage in his career he had been, among other roles, Census Commissioner for the 1901 Census of India, and he had for many years been a keen ethnographer and proponent of the anthropometric theories of Paul Topinard. Although Risley had acknowledged the earlier book of Watson and Kaye as being "famous in its day", he did not refer to it in his 1908 work. Risley had produced earlier works, including the four-volume The Tribes and Castes of Bengal, and continued his ethnographic writings and studies until his death in 1911.

The 25 illustrations contained in the book were lithographic prints – based largely on the photographs of Benjamin Simpson – that had been used to illustrate Edward Tuite Dalton's 1875 book, Descriptive Ethnology of Bengal. This meant that the illustrations were predominantly of hill tribes from one area of the country rather than the broad range that had been shown by Walton and Kaye.

The thoughts of Émile Senart are quoted extensively, although at the time of Risley's writing they were not available in English translation. The academic position of Risley himself has been described by Susan Bayly 

A memorial edition of The People of India was produced in 1915, edited by William Crooke, who had also served in the Indian Civil Service and was interested in anthropology. It contained an additional 11 illustrations and an ethnological map of the country.

Risley's career and works have been interpreted as "the apotheosis of pseudo-scientific racism", which was a theory prevalent for a century from around the 1840s that "race was one of the principal determinants of attitudes, endowments, capabilities and inherent tendencies among human beings. Race thus seemed to determine the course of human history." D. F. Pocock describes The People of India as 

The last such work, according to Pocock, was J. H. Hutton's Caste in India, published in 1944.

The People of India (1992–)

The multi-volume series of books published from 1992 under the auspices of the government-run Anthropological Survey of India (AnSI) adopted the same title as the colonial works of 1868–1875 and 1908. The project was more detailed than the official ethnological surveys of the British Raj, which had a policy of ignoring communities of less than 2000 people and which laid much emphasis on anthropometry. The AnSI adopted a cut-off point of 200 members and preferred blood groups to be "the crucial indicator of physical difference".

Kumar Suresh Singh, a tribal historian and officer in the Indian Administrative Service who held posts including that of Director-General of the AnSI, had responsibility for the organisation, compilation and oversight of the survey and publications. The intent was to produce an anthropological study of the differences and linkages between all of the communities in India. The survey involved 470 scholars and identified 4694 communities during its period of fieldwork between October 1985 and 1994. Sinha notes a total of 3000 scholars, which figure appears to include those involved at various seminars and workshops. The full results of the survey comprises 43 published volumes, of which 12 had been produced at the time of Singh's death.

The volumes were produced as two collections, with the first eleven comprising the National series and the remainder being known as the State series.

Laura Jenkins has noted that the project has been undertaken 

The books use colonial ethnographies extensively and note, for example, that One reviewer has stated that, ‘The People of India study conducted by K.S. Singh was entirely swadeshi. This presented a major breakthrough not only in terms of conceptual framework but also in methodology. The POI project sought to assemble people’s knowledge pertaining to culture and environment, and explore the idioms, the structures, and the cognitive processes reflected in the understanding and perception of people about themselves, and their relationship to one another and with the environment’. [25]

It further states that, ‘It is this home-grown approach to visualize Indian society in terms of native paradigms which made the PoI project an essentially Swadeshi Mission, designed in terms of indigenous prerequisites and ethos of people. It was meant to situate the people in diverse culture zones which were not bounded but porous. The ‘People of India’ study has indeed proved to be a milestone in post-colonial ethnography, with emphasis on Indian ideal of cultural pluralism’. [26]

The People of India project of  the Anthropological Survey of India (ASI), planned on a breathtaking scale, was launched on October 2, 1985. People of India project had identified mainly ‘2753 communities’ distributed over 32 states/Union territories. These communities made up for 4653 elements when a community population is counted in each state/union territory as a separate element. [27]

The PoI project used the term ‘community’ to describe the castes, tribes and minorities in entire India. Moreover, under the category ‘community’ non-caste structures, language and religion-based identities including the minorities as well as those social formations, which stood beyond the jati framework were subsumed. Indeed, the preferred category of ‘community’ carried a value free connotation. The works of Irawati Karve have influenced the PoI study to a great extent. Her Sanskrit textual approach to the study of kinship and her skilful use of the bio-cultural data in the understanding of Indian situation has been a constant source of inspiration. [28] [29]

ASI also brought out an Anthropological Atlas providing cartographic representation of distribution of cultural traits and languages, linguistic traits, anthropometry, demographic dimensions of population, and biological traits (Singh 1994). The distribution of traits is presented in three parts: ecology and cultural traits; language and linguistic traits; and demographic and biological traits. There are in all 149 maps. Of these, 72 are on ecology and cultural traits, covering a wide spectrum - including environment, distribution of communities, cropping patterns, food habits, social organization, and occupations. The distribution of language families and of linguistic traits which cut across language families is presented in 16 maps. There are 7 maps covering demographic dimensions such as sex-ratios, household sizes, marital status, and literacy. Finally, 54 biological maps present the distribution of somatometric variations, dermatoglyphics, blood groups, and several other genetic traits. The third section consists of 61 maps on demographic and biological traits. [30]

In order to depict the languages and scripts, ASI brought out a separate volume on Language and Scripts. This comprehensive survey of India's languages shows how languages are distributed into different language families. Language is an important source of diversity and unity. There were, at the time of survey, as many as 325 languages and 25 scripts in use, deriving from various linguistic families. Then there are hundreds of ‘localised’ dialects in use among the communities. In language-contact situations the incidence of bilingualism is extremely high: it is not uncommon for tribals to speak up to four languages, and despite the dominance of a regional language, all of the States and Union Territories are multilingual [31]

The post-colonial people of India project located and identified communities in terms of their cultural regions as also linguistic, biological and cultural traits. Thus, the ‘People of India project’ divided India into 91 cultural regions, not as static units but in a state of continuous flux. Within these regions, as many as 775 traits were identified, relating to ecology, settlement, identity, food habits, social organizations, economy and occupation, including linkages and impact of change and development. Data were collected from each community in terms of their sharing of such traits. It is observed that rootedness in the eco-cultural zone is an outstanding characteristic of people of India. The lives and livelihood, the occupations, dress patterns cannot be really separated from their landscape, climate and occupations. [25]

Unlike colonial era people of India study, this postcolonial people of India study did not treat communities as disparate islands but as part of a "vibrant interaction" .[26]

People of India data sets reveal that there is very high correlation of traits between so-called Dalit/Adivasi communities and the Hindus, between Hindus and Sikhs; between Hindus and Buddhists and between Hindus and Muslims. It is observed that there are communities who simultaneously identity themselves as Hindu-Sikh, Hindu-Muslim, and Hindu-Buddhist. [26]

For critical scientific analysis of the PoI data, K.S.Singh collaborated with the National Informatics Centre and Centre for Ecological Science, Bangalore, where a team headed by the renowned socio-biologist Madhav Gadgil studied the PoI findings. Madhav Gadgil and his team along with a linguist and an anthropologist from ASI examined the demographic history of India on the basis of a fresh insights into linguistic and anthropological pattern based on the People of India data of the ASI . Based on scientific analysis of the PoI data, two important publications were made. [32] [33]

The People of India study conducted by K.S. Singh was entirely swadeshi. The POI project sought to assemble people’s knowledge pertaining to culture and environment, and explore the idioms, the structures, and the cognitive processes reflected in the understanding and perception of people about themselves, and their relationship to one another and with the environment. Generating ethnographic accounts of 4,694 communities (main communities being 2,205, major segments being 589, and territorial units being 1,900) was not an easy task. Even more complicated was gathering nomenclatures of communities, range of synonyms, surnames, and titles and investing their vibrant involvement in space, ethos and cultural traits. PoI never ignored the basic identities of the communities, which have many segments/layers, which are tied with regional cultural/linguistic and ecological patterns. Thus, the project explored the various ways in which people interact, integrate, enmesh, share traits and space, and also discover the processes that bring them together.  [26] [34]

This project was designed in terms of indigenous prerequisites and ethos of people. It was meant to situate the people in diverse culture zones which were not bounded but porous. The ‘People of India’ study has indeed proved to be a milestone in post-colonial ethnography, with emphasis on Indian ideal of cultural pluralism. [25] [26]

See also
Scientific racism

References
Citations
25. Das (2006). p. 3156

26. Das (2021). p. 225

27. Singh (1992). p. 180

28. Singh (1996). p. 240

29. Singh (1998). p.310

30. Singh (1994). P. 94

31. Singh and Manoharan (1994). P. 188

32 Gadgil, Joshi, Shambu Prasad, Manoharan, and Patil (1997). p.100

33. Joshi, Gadgil, and Patil, (1993). P.10

34. Singh, (2012). p. 95  
Bibliography

Das, N. K. (2006). "People of India and Indian Anthropology: K S Singh: A Tribute". Economic and Political Weekly. 41 (29): 3156–3158. JSTOR 4418461.
Das, N. K. (2021). K.S. Singh: Anthropologist and Tribal Historian. Vol. 1. In Architects of Anthropology in India. Sarthak Sengupta (ed.).New Delhi: Gyan Publishing House. pp. 225–240.

Gadgil, M., Joshi, N.V., Shambu Prasad, U.V., Manoharan,S. and Suresh Patil 1997. Peopling of India. In: The Indian Human Heritage, Eds. D. Balasubramanian and N. Appaji Rao. pp.100-129. Hyderabad: Universities Press.

Joshi,N.V., Gadgil, M. and Patil, S. 1993a. Exploring cultural diversity of the people of India. Current Science. 64, (1), 10-17.

Singh, K. S. 1992. People of India: An Introduction. Vol. 1 National Series. Calcutta: Anthropological Survey of India [K.S. Singh 2002. People of India: An Introduction (revised edition) (People of India: National series). New Delhi: Oxford University Press]
Singh K. S. 1996. Communities, Segments, Synonyms, Surnames and Titles (People of India, National Series, Vol. VIII). New Delhi: Oxford University Press
Singh, K. S. 1998. People of India: India’s Communities. New Delhi: Oxford University Press
Singh, K. S. 1994. People of India: An Anthropological Atlas: Ecology and Cultural Traits, Languages and Linguistic Traits, Demographic and Biological Traits. New Delhi: Oxford University Press]
Singh, K. S. and S. Manoharan. 1994. People of India: Languages and Scripts New Delhi: Oxford University Press]
Singh, K. S. 2012.  ‘Diversity, Identity and Linkages: Explorations in Historical Ethnography’, New Delhi: Oxford University Press 

Watson and Kaye's The People of India

Further reading

External links 

Books about India
British anthropologists
Indian anthropologists
Ethnography